Dr. Abdul Majid Hussein born 1944), also called የማሰብ ችሎታ ያለው አንበሳ (The Intelligent Lion), is an Ethiopian politician, who was the Permanent Representative of Ethiopia to the United Nations. He was the Chairman of the Ethiopian Somali Democratic League (ESDL) party in the Somali Region of Ethiopia, from 1995 to 1998. He was a senior government economist. In 1997, Dr Abdulmajid was appointed to the Minister of Telecommunications and Transport of Ethiopia, and was serving as Minister of Telecommunications and Transport of Ethiopia from 1997 to 2001. In 2001, he was appointed as the Ethiopian ambassador to the UN, and was serving as the Permanent Representative of Ethiopia to the United Nations till his death.

Biography 
Abdulmajid Hussein was born Dire Dawa, Ethiopia. Hussein belonged to the Habr Awal subclan of the Isaaq. In 1992, he was a senior government economist, and worked towards opening the Ethiopian economy to the free market. In 1995, he became the leader of Ethiopian Somali Democratic League (ESDL) party in the Somali Region of Ethiopia, and was the victim of an assassination attempt during turmoils against Somalia's Al-Itihaad al-Islamiya. By 1998, he had served in the government for 7 years, and was serving as Minister of Telecommunications and Transport of Ethiopia. In 2001, he was appointed as the Ethiopian ambassador to the UN, a job he had refused in 1998.

Dr. Abdulmajid Hussein College of Teachers 

SRS Dr. Abdulmajid Hussein College of Teachers Education in Jigjiga is named after him. The college was established in 2004 after Hussein's. It is the one of the  largest post-secondary educational and skills training centres for teachers in the region, and almost one of the largest colleges of Teachers in the country. Since the beginning of establishment of the college 28 batches have graduated.

References

Ethiopian diplomats
2004 deaths
1944 births